Bretton is both a given name and surname. Notable people with the name include:

Given name
 Bretton Byrd (1904–1959), British composer and musician
 Bretton Richardson, American baseball coach
 Mark de Bretton Platts (born 1947), British philosopher

Surename
 Raphaël Bretton (1920–2011), French set decorator
 Sally Bretton (born 1975/1976), English actress
 William Bretton (1909–1971), New Zealand clergy